A certificate of current cost or pricing data is a signed statement from a bidder stating that, to the best of the bidder's knowledge and belief, the costs or pricing data which they have submitted in a tender are accurate, complete and current at the time. A form for such submission is available in the Federal Acquisition Regulation (FAR) at section 15.406-2.

The US Truth in Negotiation Act 1962 ("TINA") requires that contractors submitting bids should supply certified cost or pricing data before an agreement on price for most negotiated procurements for government contracts worth more than $750,000 for prime contracts awarded before July 1, 2018, and $2 million for prime contracts awarded on or after July 1, 2018. Initially, TINA only applied to the Department of Defense, the Coast Guard, and NASA.

Certified cost or pricing data may not be obtained for acquisitions at or below the simplified acquisition threshold. Other exceptions are stated in FAR 15.403-1(b) or may be adopted under a waiver requested by the contracting officer in exceptional circumstances. If certified cost or pricing data has been requested by the Government and submitted by an offeror, but an exception is later found to apply, the data should not be considered to be "certified".

The requirement for a certificate of cost or pricing data may also apply to sub-contractors at any tier in the supply chain.

References

Government procurement in the United States